

Hoshiko Yamane (山根星子, Yamane Hoshiko; born 4 April 1981) is a Japanese violinist, composer and performer based in Berlin. She has been a member of Tangerine Dream since 2011.

Biography 
Born in Osaka, Yamane attended the University of Arts in Aichi.  Her training destined her to be a violinist in classical music, but she extended her practice to modern music and later to pop music. She moved to Europe to further study in Berlin and Rostock, finally relocating in Berlin.

In 2009 she started an experimental contemporary dance and live music project, Tansik, with dancer Chizu Kimura.  The group produced e.g. the plays "~ing" in 2012 and "Discord" in 2016.

In 2011 she joined the band Tangerine Dream.

In 2013 she started a solo project, Tukico, with a debut performance at Madame Claude, Berlin, in 2014.  She pairs up with Jürgen Heidemann in KiSeki (木石), producing experimental music with the sound of wood (木, wood of a violin, played by Yamane) and stones (石, stones, played by Heidemann). ("Kiseki" is a pun on 奇跡 (kiseki) which means "miracle" in Japanese.) She often toured as a violinist with Jane Birkin and other Japanese musicians.  She composes and plays with the Berlin-based Motimaru Dance Company.

In 2017 she performed on the Cargo original motion picture soundtrack composed by Thorsten Quaeschning of Tangerine Dream.

Discography (partial) 
2014: KiSeki: Traumstein
2015: Tukico: SD card [Regen from Ame] (video works)
2016: Hoshiko Yamane/Tansik: Discord (dance soundtrack)
2017: Hoshiko Yamane: MUT (dance soundtrack)
2017: Hoshiko Yamane/Duenn: Nakaniwa
2017: Hoshiko Yamane: A Story of a Man EP
2018: Hoshiko Yamane: Threads
2018: Hoshiko Yamane: Twilight EP (dance soundtrack)

Tangerine Dream (partial) 
2011: Live at the Lowry (The Gate of Saturn, live at the Lowry, Manchester)
2011: Knights of Asheville (live in Asheville)
2011: The Island of the Fay (guest on track 4)
2011: The Angel of the West Window (plays on 3 tracks)
2015: Supernormal – The Australian Concerts 2014
2015: Quantum Key
2016: Live at The Philharmony Szczecin – Poland
2016: Particles
2017: The Sessions I
2017: Light Flux
2017: Quantum Gate
2018: The Sessions II
2018: The Sessions III
2018: The Sessions IV
2019: The Sessions V
2019: Recurring Dreams
2020: The Sessions VI
2021: The Sessions VII
2021: Probe 6-8
2022: Raum

References

External links 

1981 births
21st-century classical violinists
21st-century women composers
21st-century Japanese women musicians
Ambient musicians
Japanese classical violinists
Japanese composers
Japanese electronic musicians
Japanese women composers
Living people
Tangerine Dream members